Ilogbo Elegba is a community in Ojo, Lagos State, the administrative divisions of Nigeria.
It is a community under Awori District.

References

Populated places in Lagos State